The 1985 Belgian motorcycle Grand Prix was the eighth round of the 1985 Grand Prix motorcycle racing season. It took place on the weekend of 5–7 July 1985 at the Circuit de Spa-Francorchamps.

Classification

500 cc

References

Belgian motorcycle Grand Prix
Belgian
Motorcycle Grand Prix